Claire Bodson is a Belgian stage and film actress. She studied at the Royal Conservatory of Brussels and began working in theatre after developing an interest in acting. After some stage experiences at the Théâtre de l'Ancre in Charleroi, Bodson became a regular performer at the Théâtre National Wallonie-Bruxelles, starting in 1997.

She made her film debut in Private Lessons (2008), a drama film directed by Joachim Lafosse that earned her a Magritte Award nomination in the category of Best Supporting Actress. She returned to film acting in 2014 with Our Children, which marked her second collaboration with Lafosse.

Bodson then appeared in Jean-Pierre and Luc Dardenne's film Young Ahmed (2019). At the 10th Magritte Awards, it received nine nominations, including Best Supporting Actress for Bodson. She is known to be selective about her film roles.

Filmography

References

External links

Living people
Belgian film actresses
Belgian stage actresses
Actresses from Brussels
20th-century Belgian actresses
21st-century Belgian actresses
Year of birth missing (living people)